The  is an art museum in Minami-Karasuyama, Setagaya, Tokyo. It is owned by Setagaya City and operated by Setagaya Cultural Foundation (Setagaya Bunka Zaidan).  The museum was founded in April 1995 as a comprehensive museum of modern literature originated from Setagaya. It also functions as a library, as well as museum and archives.

The building was designed by Kenji Sugimura and has three stories. The first floor consists of exhibition rooms and a library that houses about 80,000 collections. The second floor has a larger exhibition space and a conference room. Its construction area is 1,527.08 square meters and the total floor area is 4,593.92 square meters.

In the museum, there are over 90,000 works including materials, such as letters and manuscripts. Besides permanent  exhibitions, they have also temporary exhibitions which are changed regularly. Materials and literary works of writers with ties to Setagaya City are available to the public.

References

External links
 Museum Homepage
 Setagaya Cultural Foundation

Art museums and galleries in Tokyo
Art museums established in 1995
Museums in Tokyo
Buildings and structures in Setagaya
1995 establishments in Japan
Literary museums in Japan